Typhoon Rusa was the most powerful typhoon to strike South Korea in 43 years. It was the 21st JTWC tropical depression, the 15th named storm, and the 10th typhoon of the 2002 Pacific typhoon season. It developed on August 22 from the monsoon trough in the northwestern Pacific Ocean, well to the southeast of Japan. For several days, Rusa moved to the northwest, eventually intensifying into a powerful typhoon. On August 26, the storm moved across the Amami Islands of Japan, where Rusa left 20,000 people without power and caused two fatalities.

After weakening slightly, Rusa made landfall on Goheung, South Korea with winds of 140 km/h (85 mph 10 minute sustained). It was able to maintain much of its intensity due to warm air and instability from a nearby cold front. Over 17,000 houses were damaged, and large areas of crop fields were flooded. In South Korea, Rusa killed at least 233 people, making it the deadliest typhoon there in over 43 years, and caused $4.2 billion in damage. The typhoon also dropped heavy rainfall in neighboring North Korea, leaving 26,000 people homeless and killing three. Rusa also destroyed large areas of crops in the country already affected by ongoing famine conditions. The typhoon later became extratropical over eastern Russia on September 1, dissipating three days later.

Meteorological history

The monsoon trough spawned a tropical depression on August 22 north of Bikini Atoll and southwest of Wake Island. It moved to the west-northwest, a movement it would maintain for much of its duration. At 1800 UTC on August 25, the Japan Meteorological Agency (JMA) upgraded Rusa to a typhoon while the system was northeast of the Northern Marianas Islands. The next day, the agency estimated that the typhoon attained peak winds of 150 km/h (90 mph 10 minute sustained). Around the same time, the Joint Typhoon Warning Center (JTWC) estimated peak winds of 215 km/h (135 mph 1 minute sustained).

While at peak intensity, Rusa struck the Japanese island of Amami Ōshima. After maintaining the peak winds for about 12 hours, Rusa weakened slightly as it continued to the west-northwest, but on August 28 the JMA again reported the typhoon attained winds of 150 km/h (90 mph 10 minute sustained). The typhoon again weakened slightly on August 29 while passing between the Amami Islands and Japan. Thereafter, Rusa turned to the north toward the Korean Peninsula. Warm, moist air blew across the peninsula ahead of the storm, which prevented significant weakening, and an approaching cold front contributed to atmospheric instability. At around 0800 UTC on August 31, Rusa made landfall on Goheung, South Korea, with winds of 140 km/h (85 mph 10 minute sustained). According to the JTWC, Rusa was the most powerful typhoon to hit the country since 1959. The typhoon rapidly weakened while crossing the country, deteriorating into a tropical depression early on September 1. Around that time, the JTWC issued its last advisory on the system. The depression turned to the northeast, and after moving through the Sea of Japan, Rusa became extratropical over Primorsky Krai in the Russian Far East late on September 1. The extratropical remnants continued northeast and dissipated on September 4 over the Kamchatka Peninsula.

Preparations and impact

Although damage was heaviest in South Korea, Typhoon Rusa first affected Japan. The threat from the storm prompted the Okinawa government to cancel a disaster drill for the island. On the island, high seas from Rusa left two United States marines missing; a later news report included the two missing as storm-related fatalities. In the Anami Islands, Rusa destroyed six houses, forcing 38 people to evacuate. The storm left 20,000 people without power and cancelled several flights. Winds reached  in Nomozaki, Nagasaki. The heaviest of the precipitation fell in Nara Prefecture, where a station reported  in one hour. At least 275 houses were flooded, and 137 houses were damaged. During its passage, Rusa injured 12 people, 4 seriously. The typhoon also produced light rain and high seas along the coast of Taiwan.

Before Rusa affected South Korea, the Korea Meteorological Administration (KMA) issued high sea warnings on August 29. Airports were closed in the southern portion of the country, and dams let out water to prevent excessive flooding. Typhoon Rusa affected much of South Korea with heavy rainfall and high winds. Jeju Island off the country's southern coast reported  of rainfall, producing flash flooding that flooded cars. On the island, high winds downed trees and left 60,000 people without power. All lower and middle schools on the island were closed, and residents were stranded after officials halted ferry and airline service. High amounts of rainfall were reported on Jeju Province and along the country's southern coast, although the heaviest rainfall was only reported in a small region. In Gangneung, located in the eastern portion of the country, severe thunderstorms developed due to high instability resulting from humid air from the east interacting with the Taebaek Mountains, producing high amounts of precipitation. In the South Korea interior, rainfall rates were considered a 1 in 200 year event.

Damage in South Korea was estimated at $4.2 billion (₩5.15 trillion KRW). Damage was heaviest in Gangneung, where about 36,000 homes and 622 military buildings were flooded. At the airbase in Gangneung, floods submerged 16 jet fighters. Along the coast, high winds damaged 640 boats and about 200,000 marine buildings, and 265 industrial buildings were also damaged. The heavy rainfall left mudslides in the country, one of which covered ten cars in Gangneung. Flooding and the landslides disrupted the country's infrastructure; the storm destroyed 274 bridges and damaged roads and rails at 164 locations. Rusa killed 300,000 livestock and flooded 85,000 hectares (210,000 acres) of crop fields, representing 6% of the country's agricultural lands, mostly affecting fruit and vegetables. The storm caused the Vana H Cup KBC Augusta golf tournament to end early, and a stadium to be used for the 2002 Asian Games was damaged. Across the country, 88,625 people were forced to evacuate due to the typhoon, and 17,046 houses were damaged. High winds left 1.25 million people after blowing down 24,000 power lines. There were 213 deaths in the country, and another 33 were missing and presumed dead; This made Rusa the deadliest typhoon in the country in more than 43 years.

The rains caused flash flooding and increased surface runoff. This occurred about a month after similarly heavy rains caused severe damage in the country. The rains from Rusa damaged and flooded thousands of houses and many public buildings, and destroyed 86,000 tonnes of crop fields; the latter was most significant due to the country's ongoing famine conditions. Damage was heaviest in Kangwon Province, and the typhoon affected four provinces and one administrative city. More than 26,000 people were left homeless in the country, although advance warning allowed for evacuations. Rusa disrupted transportation by destroying 25 km (16 mi) of roads and 24 bridges; however, most of the damage was isolated to a small region. There were three deaths in North Korea.

The typhoon also affected the Russian Far East. On Sakhalin island, Rusa's remnants dropped heavy rainfall, the equivalence of two months average precipitation. The rains flooded 350 houses, but there were no deaths in the region.

Aftermath
Following the storm, damaged buildings polluted rivers in South Korea with chemicals and heavy metals. The country utilized 30,000 soldiers to assist in cleaning up and repairing storm damage. President Kim Dae-jung authorized emergency funding for disaster aid. Much of Gangneung lost power and water; as a result, relief supplies were sent to the affected citizens. By ten days after Rusa struck the country, power lines were restored and transportation returned to normal. After an appeal to other residents in the country, the South Korea Red Cross chapter received $49 million in donations (₩58 billion won), mostly from the country's northwest portion. The agency provided 50,680 meals to 16,919 families, as well as clothing and cooking supplies. Residents in the country raised about $60 million (₩72.1 billion won) in disaster relief, the highest such total for a disaster in the nation. The Chinese Red Cross sent $20,000 to the South Korean Red Cross in the weeks after the storm. On September 13, the South Korean government declared 203 cities and counties as disaster zones, which entitled 8,714 families who sustained storm damage to receive government loans. The combined storm damage and floods preceding the storm caused the nation's economy to contract during the third quarter of 2002. The 2003 fiscal year reported a $300 million deficit for non-life insurance companies, mostly due to losses from the typhoon. Crop damage from Rusa caused the price of rice to increase to their highest levels since 1980. In the year after the storm, the South Korean government worked to reconstruct damaged roads and provided monthly assistance payments to families who lost their homes. However, many residents remained homeless and were residing in temporary shelters. The country's Habitat for Humanity built 69 houses for storm victims in 2003, although that was only for a small portion of the overall number of people affected. About a year after Rusa hit, Typhoon Maemi also struck South Korea with stronger winds, causing $3.74 billion in damage and 117 deaths. The damage total was less than from Rusa but was more significant to industrial areas.

In North Korea, the Red Cross provided relief supplies to residents affected by flooding. The agency's international disaster relief fund provided FR75,000 (2002 CHF (US$50,000).. Soldiers were used to assist in search and rescue missions and to repair damaged infrastructure. Due to storm damage, the Red Cross in North Korea distributed over 2.1 million water purification tablets and over 11,000 water containers. The agency also provided 32,753 blankets and 4,931 kitchen units. After the storm, people left homeless by the storm sought shelter with neighbors or in shelters. A South Korean dairy company donated 42,000 cans of baby formula to North Korea.

The name Rusa was retired after its usage in 2002, and was replaced with Nuri in 2004.

See also

List of retired Pacific typhoon names (JMA)
Typhoon Sarah (1959)
Typhoon Phanfone (2014)
Typhoon Damrey (2012)
Typhoon Soulik (2018)

Notes

References

External links

RSMC Tokyo - Typhoon Center
Best Track Data of Typhoon Rusa (0215) 
Best Track Data (Graphics) of Typhoon Rusa (0215)
Best Track Data (Text)
JTWC Best Track Data of Typhoon 21W (Rusa)

2002 Pacific typhoon season
Retired Pacific typhoons
Typhoons
Typhoons in Japan
Typhoons in North Korea
Typhoons in Russia
Typhoons in South Korea
August 2002 events in Asia
September 2002 events in Asia
Rusa